Michael Richards Peacock (born 28 September 1940) is an English former footballer who made 46 appearances in the Football League playing as a goalkeeper for Darlington in the early 1960s. He also played non-league football for clubs including Shildon.

Notes

References

1940 births
Living people
Association football goalkeepers
Shildon A.F.C. players
Darlington F.C. players
English Football League players
English footballers